Qaṣr Al-Waṭan is the presidential palace of the United Arab Emirates, located in Abu Dhabi.

History 
Construction of the palace was completed in 2017.

To celebrate the heritage of the country, Sheikhs Khalifa bin Zayed Al Nahyan (Ruler of Abu Dhabi and President of the United Arab Emirates) and Mohammed bin Zayed Al Nahyan (Crown Prince of Abu Dhabi and Deputy Supreme Commander of the UAE Armed Forces) decided to open the palace to the public in 2019. Prior to its opening, the palace was used only for official purposes, Mainly hosting foreign leaders of states, and for meetings of the country's supreme council and federal cabinet. Even after being opened to the public, the palace continues to be used for these purposes.

The palace was opened to the public on the 11th of March 2019, in a ceremony hosted by Sheikh Mohammed bin Zayed and Mohammed bin Rashid Al Maktoum (Vice-President and Prime Minister of the UAE and Ruler of Dubai). In August, the palace was named by the travel and tourism website of Hotel and Rest among the top 20 landmarks of art and culture in the World. In 2020, the Qasr Al Watan Presidential Palace was nominated for the World Travel Awards as the main cultural tourist attraction in the Middle East.

Interior and exterior 
With a façade made of white granite and limestone, the mainly white palace is intricately designed and ornately decorated. The dome is located on top of the central chamber known as "The Great Hall", which is surrounded by two wings to the east and west.

Eastern wing 
The eastern wing has the "House of Knowledge", where a number of artefacts and other objects of importance are stored. Stored objects include gifts presented by visiting officials from other countries, and 2 religious texts in the "House of Knowledge": the Quran (including a replica of the Birmingham manuscript) and the Bible (including the Psalms of David). There is also a library with more than 50,000 books which document the cultural, social and political history of the country.

Western wing 
The western wing has halls which are used for official purposes. Here, there is a room known as the "Spirit of Collaboration", where meetings of the UAE Cabinet and Federal Supreme Council would be hosted, besides summits of international bodies like the Organisation of the Islamic Conference, Arab League and Gulf Cooperation Council. Elsewhere, banquets for official events, besides diplomatic gifts from other countries, are kept.

See also 
 List of cultural property of national significance in the United Arab Emirates
 Qasr Al Muwaiji
 Sheikh Zayed Mosque
 The Founder's Memorial

References

External links 
 Inside the Abu Dhabi Presidential Palace (Gulf News on YouTube)

Buildings and structures in Abu Dhabi
Tourist attractions in Abu Dhabi